Silicon Beach is the Westside region of the Los Angeles metropolitan area that is home to more than 500 technology companies, including startups. It is particularly applied to the coastal strip from Los Angeles International Airport north to the Santa Monica Mountains, but the term may be applied loosely or colloquially to most anywhere in the Los Angeles Basin. Startups seeded here include Snapchat and Tinder. Major technology companies that opened offices in the region including Google, Yahoo!, YouTube, BuzzFeed, Facebook, Salesforce, AOL, Electronic Arts, Sony, EdgeCast Networks, MySpace, Amazon.com, Apple, Inc., and Netflix. By some 2012 metrics, the region was the second- or third-most prominent technology hub in the world. In the first six months of 2013, 94 new start-ups in Silicon Beach raised over $500 million in funding, and there were nine acquisitions.

The area offers relatively easy access to LAX (Los Angeles International Airport), the biggest and most connected airport in western North America.

As in the San Francisco Bay Area, the influx of technology companies has boosted home and office rents and real estate prices in Playa Vista, Playa Del Rey, Westchester, Santa Monica, and Venice, already high previously due to beachfront location. The effects are also spilling over into Marina del Rey and Hermosa Beach.

Start-up pockets have also emerged in nearby Culver City, West L.A., and El Segundo. Other pockets include Downtown Los Angeles,  Beverly Hills, Hollywood, Glendale, and the San Fernando Valley, which were pricey areas even before the influx. The tendency of companies to congregate in these centrally-located, high income areas has raised concerns about the feasibility of racial minorities joining the workforce, as they tend to live in further outlying areas.

Silicon Beach is also home to start-up incubators and accelerators, such as Amplify.LA, Science, Disney Accelerator, and TechStars Cedars Sinai. 

Higher education institutions headquartered in Silicon Beach include Loyola Marymount University and Otis College of Art and Design. Other higher education institutions in the nearby Southern California region or with satellite campuses in/nearby Silicon Beach include: Pepperdine University, Santa Monica College, Art Center College of Design, California Institute of Technology, University of California Los Angeles, University of Southern California, Occidental College, and the Claremont Colleges.

List of technology companies based in Silicon Beach

Other uses 

 1983: PC Magazine reported that "some people are starting to call" Boca Raton, Florida—where IBM had developed its Personal Computer, and other technology companies had facilities—"Silicon Beach, in deference to the great valley of the West". 
 1984: Silicon Beach Software was formed in San Diego, California. 
 2008: Silicon Beach Australia was used to describe the country's tech industry, including startup hubs in Sydney, Melbourne, Brisbane, and Perth.

References

High-technology business districts in the United States
Information technology places
Science and technology in Greater Los Angeles
Economic regions of California
Westside (Los Angeles County)
Marina del Rey, California
Playa Vista, Los Angeles
Santa Monica, California
Venice, Los Angeles
Geography of Los Angeles County, California
Regions of California